This is a list of museums in the Netherlands.

Drenthe

Assen
 Draaiorgelmuseum
 Drents Museum
 Stoottroepen Museum

Borger-Odoorn
 Hunebedcentrum

Coevorden
 Stedelijk Museum (Coevorden)

Dwingeloo
 Planetron (Dwingeloo)

Eelde
 Museum de Buitenplaats
 International Wooden Shoe Museum Eelde
 Museum Vosbergen

Emmen
 Ergens in Nederland 1939-1945

Erica
 Industrieel Smalspoor Museum

Exloo
 Het Bebinghehoes

Frederiksoord
 Museum De Koloniehof

Hoogeveen
 De 5000 Morgen

Meppel
 Drukkerijmuseum

Nieuw-Buinen
 Royal Goedewaagen

Nieuw-Dordrecht
 Museum Collectie Brands

Nieuw-Roden
 Kunstpaviljoen

Orvelte
 Orvelte

Roden
 Speelgoedmuseum Kinderwereld

Rolde
 Cuby + Blizzards Museum in Grolloo
 Het Dorp van Bartje

Schoonoord
 Ellert en Brammert

Veenhuizen
 Gevangenismuseum

Vledder
 Miramar Zeemuseum
 Museums Vledder

Zuidlaren
 De Wachter Molenmuseum

Flevoland

Almere
 Museum De Paviljoens

Ens
Museum Schokland

Espel
 Ferguson Farm

Lelystad
 Nationaal Luchtvaart Themapark Aviodrome
 Bataviawerf
 Nationaal Ruimtevaart Museum
 Nieuw Land Poldermuseum
 RACM Lelystad

Nagele
 Museum Nagele

Urk
 Het Oude Raadhuis

Zeewolde
 De Verbeelding kunst landschap natuur

Friesland

Allingawier
 Aldfaerserf

Appelscha
 Culinair Historisch Kookmuseum

Bakhuizen
 Scheermuseum

Beers
 Bezoekerscentrum Uniastate

Bergum
 Streekmuseum/Volkssterrenwacht

Birdaard
 Ruurd Wiersma Hus

Bolsward
 It Gysbert Japicxhus
 Us Heit

Buren
 Swartwoude

Dokkum
 Admiraliteitshuis
 Fries Grafisch Museum

Drachten
 Museum Smallingerland

Eernewoude
 De Stripe

Exmorra
 Fries landbouw museum

Franeker
 Museum Martena voorheen 't Coopmanshûs
 Eise Eisinga Planetarium

Gorredijk
 Museum Opsterland

Grouw
 Mineralogisch Museum

Harlingen
Gemeentemuseum het Hannemahuis

Heerenveen
 Museum Belvédère
 Museum Willem van Haren met F. Domela Nieuwenhuis Museum

Hindeloopen
 Eerste Friese Schaatsmuseum
 Museum Hindeloopen

Hollum
 Abraham Fock
 Sorgdrager

IJlst
 Kijk Centrum Nooitgedagt

Jelsum
 Dekemastate

Joure
 Museum Joure

Kornwerderzand
 Kazemattenmuseum

Leeuwarden
 Fries Letterkundig Centrum
 Fries Museum/ Verzetsmuseum Friesland
 Natuurmuseum Fryslân
 Pier Pander Museum
 Princessehof (nationaal keramiekmuseum)

Lemmer
 Duikmuseum Lemmer

Marsum
 Poptaslot

Moddergat
 Museum 't Fiskerhúske

Molkwerum
 Elvis Presley museum

Nij Beets
 It Damshûs

Nijemirdum
 Koeienmuseum

Oldeboorn
 Oudheidkamer Uldrik Bottema

Schiermonnikoog
 Schelpenmuseum Paal 14

Sloten
 Museum Stedhûs Sleat

Sneek
 Nationaal Modelspoormuseum
 Fries Scheepvaart Museum

Stavoren
 Ponthuus Toankamer

Tijnje
 1e Nederlandse Opel Museum

Vlieland
 De Noordwester
 Museum Tromp's Huys

West-Terschelling
 't Behouden Huys
 Visserijmuseum Aike van Stien

Wolvega
 Museum 't Kiekhuus
 Oudheidkamer Weststellingwerf

Wommels
 De striid tsjin it wetter

Workum
 Jopie Huisman Museum
 Museum Kerkelijke Kunst
 Museum Warkums Erfskip

Gelderland

Aalten
 Boerderijmuseum de Neeth
 Markt 12
 Museum Frerikshuus
 Freriksschure

Almen
 Mosterdmuseum
 Museum voor oude boekdrukkunst

Apeldoorn
 Nederlands Politiemuseum
 CODA
 Het Loo Palace

Appeltern
 Stoomgemaal De Tuut

Arnhem
 Arnhems Oorlogsmuseum 40-45
 Museum Moderne Kunst Arnhem
 Netherlands Open Air Museum
 Historisch Museum Arnhem
 Nederlands Watermuseum
 Nederlands Wijnmuseum

Asperen
 Het Minidome

Barneveld
 Museum Nairac
 Nederlands Pluimveemuseum
 Oude Ambachten & Speelgoed Museum

Beneden-Leeuwen
 Museum Tweestromenland

Bennekom
 Kijk & Luistermuseum

Berg en Dal
 Afrika museum

Borculo
 Brandweermuseum Borculo
 Kristalmuseum
 Museum 'De Bezinning 1940-45'
 Museumboerderij De Lebbenberg
 Radio Museum Borculo

Bronkhorst
 Dickens Museum

Buren
 Museum der Koninklijke Marechaussee
 Museum 'Buren & Oranje'
 Museum De Boerenwagen

Culemborg
 Gispen
 Elvis Presley Museum
 Elisabeth Weeshuis museum

Didam
 Gelders Schuttersmuseum

Dinxperlo
 Grenslandmuseum

Doesburg
 Mosterdmuseum
 Streekmuseum De Roode Toren

Doetinchem
 Openbaar Vervoer Museum
 Stadsmuseum Doetinchem

Doorwerth
 Kasteel Doorwerth
 Museum voor Natuur- en Wildbeheer
 Museum Veluwezoom

Ede
 Historisch Museum Ede

Elburg
 Sjoel Elburg Verhalenmuseum
 Museum Elburg
 Nationaal Hist. Orgelmuseum

Epe
 Veluws Streekmuseum

Erichem
 Betuws Fruitteelt Museum

Groenlo
 Brouwerijmuseum

Groesbeek
 Nationaal Bevrijdingsmuseum 1944-1945

Harderwijk
 Stadsmuseum Harderwijk

Hattem
 Anton Pieck Museum
 Bakkerijmuseum Het Warme Land
 Voerman Museum Hattem

Hedel
 Historisch Museum Hedel

Heilig Landstichting
 Museumpark Orientalis

Hengelo
 Achterhoeks Museum 1940-1945

Heteren
 Gelderse Smalspoor Stichting

Heumen
 Ateliermuseum Maris Huis

Hoenderloo
 Electriciteitsmuseum + Radiotron

Hoog Soeren
 Wildpark Het Aardhuis

Klarenbeek
 Haardplatenmuseum

Lievelde
 Openluchtmuseum Erve Kots

Loenen
 Papierfabriek de Middelste Molen

Malden
 Accordeonmuseum De Muse

Nijmegen
 De Stratemakerstoren (Fortification museum)
 Natuurmuseum Nijmegen
 MuZIEum
 Museum Het Valkhof
 Nationaal Fietsmuseum Velorama
 Museum voor Anatomie & Pathologie
 Revolutiemuseum voor modelvliegtuigen

Nunspeet
 Noord-Veluws Museum

Oosterbeek
 Airborne Museum

Otterlo
 Kröller-Müller Museum

Terschuur
 Oude Ambachten & Speelgoed Museum

Tiel
 Flipje- & Streekmuseum Tiel

Velp
 Gelders Geologisch Museum

Vorchten
 Poppenspelmuseum

Wageningen
 Museum de Casteelse Poort
 Herman Brood Museum
 World Soil Museum

Warnsveld
 Cultuurhistorisch Museum

Wijchen
 Museum Kasteel Wijchen

Winterswijk
 Museum Freriks

Zaltbommel
 Maarten van Rossum Museum

Zelhem
 Museum Smedekinck

Zetten
 Museum Verpleging en Verzorging

Zevenaar
 Baksteen/dakpanmuseum
 Liemers Museum

Zutphen
 Grafisch Museum
 Museum Henriette Polak
 Stedelijk Museum Zutphen

Groningen

Aduard
 Museum Sint Bernardushof

Appingedam
 Museum Stad Appingedam

Bad Nieuweschans
 Vestingmuseum Nieuweschans

Bellingwolde
 Ambachtelijk Zadelmakerij Museum
 Museum de Oude Wolden

Blijham
 Poppentheater-museum

Borgercompagnie
 Museum Lammert Boerma

Bourtange 
 De Baracquen
 Fort Bourtange

Delfzijl 
 Museum De Steenfabriek
 Muzeeaquarium Delfzijl

Eenrum
 Abraham's Mosterdmakerij

Ezinge
 Museum Wierdenland

Groningen
 Grafisch Museum Groningen
 Groninger Museum
 Museum Canadian Allied Forces
 Natuurmuseum Groningen (Closed in 2008; collection partly in Universiteitsmuseum Groningen)
 Nederlands Stripmuseum
 Niemeyer Tabaksmuseum (Closed at 1 January 2011)
 Noordelijk Scheepvaartmuseum
 University museum Groningen
 Volkenkundig museum 'Gerardus van der Leeuw' (Closed in 2003; collection partly in Universiteitsmuseum Groningen)

Harkstede
 Museum '40-'45 (eerder in Slochteren)

Heiligerlee
 Klokkengieterijmuseum
 Museum Slag bij Heiligerlee

Houwerzijl
 De Theefabriek

Kloosterburen
 Oldtimermuseum De Ronkel

Kropswolde
 Museum voor Handwerktuigen Station Kropswolde

Leek
 Nationaal Rijtuigmuseum
 Museum Joods Schooltje

Leens
 Museumboerderij Welgelegen (Museum voor Landbouw en Ambacht)
 Landgoed Verhildersum
 NatuurDoeCentrum Insektenwereld

Lutjegast
 Abel Tasman Kabinet

Middelstum
 Museumbakkerij Mendels

Midwolda
 Museumboerderij Hermans Dijkstra
 Museum voor Oorlogshistorie

Niebert
 Schilder-en bakkerijmuseum't Steenhuis

Nieuwe Pekela
 Kapiteinshuis Pekela

Nieuwolda
 Kinderwagenmuseum
 Museumgemaal de Hoogte

Niezijl
 Blik Trommel en Oudheden Museum

Noordbroek
 Aardewerkmuseum Petrus Regout
 Gereedschapmuseum De Hobbyzolder
 Nederlands Strijkijzer-Museum
 Ot & Sien Museum

Noordhorn
 Kostuummuseum De Gouden Leeuw

Nuis
 Landbouwmuseum 't Rieuw (achter Coendersborg)

Onstwedde
 Radio & Speelgoed Museum
 Slaait'nhoes (museum/herberg)

Oude Pekela
 Museum 't Waschhuuske

Oudeschans
 Vestingmuseum Oudeschans

Pieterburen
 Koffie- en winkelmuseum

Sappemeer
 Groninger Schaatsmuseum

Slochteren
 Farm museum Duurswold
 Fraeylemaborg
 International Police Caps Collection

Stadskanaal
 Museum Musica
 Museumspoorlijn S.T.A.R.
 Streekhistorisch Centrum
 Watertoren Stadskanaal

Ter Apel
 Ter Apel Monastery
 Poppenmuseum

Termunterzijl
 Museumgemaal Cremer

Thesinge
 Smederijmuseum Smidshouk

Uithuizen
 Kantmuseum
 Menkemaborg

Uithuizermeeden
 Handwerkmuseum
 Het Behouden Blik
 Oudheidkamer

Veendam
 Veenkoloniaal Museum

Warffum
 Openluchtmuseum Het Hoogeland
 Museumsmederij

Waterhuizen
 Spoorwegmuseum Waterhuizen

Wedde
 Museum voor Naaldkunst

Wildervank
 Porseleinen Dierenpark

Winschoten
 Historische Werkplaats Molenmaker Wiertsema
 Museum Stoomgemaal
 Noordelijk Bus Museum

Winsum
 Stichting Kinderboek-Cultuurbezit

Zoutkamp
 Rijwiel- en Bromfietsmuseum
 Visserijmuseum Zoutkamp

Zuidbroek
 Noord-Nederlands Trein & Tram Museum

Zuidhorn
 Museum De Verzamelaar

Zuidwolde
 Van der Werf's Wedgwoodmuseum

Limburg

Asselt
 Museum Asselt

Beek
 Els Museum

De Peel
 Luchtdoelartillerie Museum

Echt
 M/V Museum van de Vrouw

Eijsden
 International Museum for Family History

Elsloo
 Streekmuseum Schippersbeurs

Gennep
 De Crypte
 Museum Het Petershuis

Haelen
 Leudalmuseum

Heerlen
 Thermenmuseum
 Nederlands Mijnmuseum GEON
 Sterrenwacht Limburg
 Stadsgalerij Heerlen

Helden
 De Moennik

Hoensbroek
Museum Kasteel Hoensbroek

Horn
 Museum "Terug in de tijd"

Horst
 Koperslagers museum

Horst-Melderslo
 Openluchtmuseum de Locht

Kerkrade
 Columbus earth center
 Cube design museum
 Continium discovery center

Maastricht
 Bonnefantenmuseum
 Museum de Historische Drukkerij
 Museum aan het Vrijthof
 Maastricht Natural History Museum
 NAiM / Bureau Europa
 Treasury of the Basilica of Saint Servatius

Nederweert-Eind
 Limburgs Openluchtmuseum Eynderhoof

Roermond
 Stedelijk Museum Roermond

Sint Odiliënberg
 Roerstreekmuseum

Sittard
 Het Domein

Stein
 Archeologie Museum

Steyl
 Limburgs Schutterij Museum
 Missiemuseum Steyl

Tegelen
 Ithaka Science Center
 Keramiekcentrum Tiendschuur

Thorn
 Museum Het Land van Thorn

Valkenburg
 Modelsteenkolenmijn
 Gemeentegrot
 Streekmuseum
 Kasteelruine & Fluweelengrot

Venlo
 Limburgs Museum
 Museum van Bommel van Dam

Venray
 Freulekeshuus, 't
 Odapark

Weert
 Museum Weert

North Brabant

Asten
 Nationaal Beiaardmuseum
 Natuurhistorisch Mus. De Peel

Bergeijk
 AutomusA

Bergen op Zoom
Het Markiezenhof

Best
 Klompenmuseum De Platijn
 Museum Bevrijdende Vleugels

Boxtel
 Oertijdmuseum De Groene Poort
 Wasch- en Strijkmuseum

Breda
 Breda's Museum
 Begijnhof Breda Museum
 MOTI, Museum Of The Image, previously the Graphic Design Museum
 Generaal Maczek Museum
 Bier Reclame Museum
 Heemkundig Museum Paulus van Daesdonck
 Lucifer Museum Latent
 Museum Oorlog & Vrede
 NAC Museum
 Nederlands Centrum voor Handwerken - HCH
 Stichting Princenhaags Museum
 Volkenkundig museum 'Justinus van Nassau' (opgeheven)

Budel
 WS-19

Cuijk
 Amerika Museum

Deurne
 De Wieger

Dongen
 Dongha museum

Eersel
 De Acht Zaligheden

Eindhoven
 Van Abbemuseum
 Centrum Kunstlicht in de Kunst
 DAFmuseum
 Historisch Openluchtmuseum Eindhoven
 Museum Kempenland
 Philips Gloeilampenfabriekje anno 1891
 Evoluon - National Design Museum

Etten-Leur
 Drukkerijmuseum
Streekmuseum Jan Uten Houte

Geldrop
 Weverijmuseum

Gewande
 Archeologisch en Paleontologisch Museum Hertogsgemaal

Handel
 't Museumke

Hank
 Bakeliet en Plastic Museum

Heesch
 Poppenhuismuseum

Heeswijk Dinther
 Kasteel Heeswijk

Helmond
 Gemeentemuseum Helmond

's-Hertogenbosch
 Museum De Bouwloods
 Jheronimus Bosch Art Center
 Noordbrabants Museum
 Het Oeteldonks Gemintemuzejum
 Stedelijk Museum 's-Hertogenbosch
 Museum Slager

Oss
 Museum Jan Cunen

Overloon
 Nationaal Oorlogs- en Verzetsmuseum

Raamsdonksveer
 Nationaal Automobiel Museum

Ravenstein
 Museum voor vlakglas- en emaillekunst

Rosmalen
 Autotron

Tilburg
 De Pont Modern Art
 Museum Scryption (Closed)
 Natuurmuseum Brabant
 Textielmuseum
 Kessels Music Instruments Museum
 Peerke Donders Paviljoen

Uden
 Museum voor Religieuze Kunst

Valkenswaard
 Nederlands Steendrukmuseum

Vught
 Geniemuseum
 Nationaal Monument Kamp Vught
 Vughts Historisch Museum

Waalwijk
 Nederlands Leder en Schoenen Museum

Werkendam
 Biesbosch Museum Werkendam

North Holland

Alkmaar
 Hollands Kaas Museum
 Nationaal Biermuseum "De Boom"
 Nederlands Kachel Museum
 Stedelijk Museum Alkmaar
 The Beatles Museum

Amstelveen
 Cobra Museum voor Moderne Kunst Amstelveen

Amsterdam

 Allard Pierson Museum
 Amstelhof
 Amsterdam City Archives
 Amsterdam Museum
 Amsterdam Tulip Museum
 Anne Frank House
 Artis
 Bijbels Museum
 Diamond Museum Amsterdam
 EYE Film Institute Netherlands
 Foam Fotografiemuseum Amsterdam
 Hash, Marihuana & Hemp Museum
 Heineken Experience
 Hermitage Amsterdam
 Het Schip
Huis Marseille, Museum for Photography
 Joods Historisch Museum
 KattenKabinet
 Madame Tussauds Amsterdam
 Miniature Museum
 Museum Geelvinck-Hinlopen
 Museum Jan van der Togt
 Museum of Bags and Purses
 Museum Van Loon
 Museum Vrolik
 Museum Willet-Holthuysen
 Nederlands Scheepvaartmuseum
 NEMO (museum)
 Ons' Lieve Heer op Solder
 Rembrandt House Museum
 Rijksmuseum
 Stedelijk Museum
 Torture Museum
 Tropenmuseum
 Van Gogh Museum
 Verzetsmuseum

Bergen
 Museum Kranenburgh

Beverwijk
 Museum Midden-Kennemerland

Den Helder
 Käthe Kruse Poppen en speelgoedmuseum
 Marinemuseum
 Reddingsmuseum Dorus Rijkers

Enkhuizen
 Zuiderzeemuseum

Haarlem
 Archeologisch Museum Haarlem, archeological museum of Haarlem
 Barrel Organ Museum Haarlem
 Het Dolhuys, museum of psychiatry
 Frans Hals Museum, museum of fine arts
 Geologisch Museum (1853–1864)
 Historisch Museum Haarlem (cultural history of Zuid-Kennemerland)
 Museum De Hallen, Haarlem, modern art wing of the Frans Hals museum
 NZH Vervoer Museum, (de Blauwe Tram)
 Teylers Museum (the oldest public museum in the Netherlands)

Hilversum
 Museum Hilversum
 Nederlands Instituut voor Beeld en Geluid

Hoofddorp
 Historisch Museum Haarlemmermeer, streekmuseum Haarlemmermeer

Hoorn
 Affichemuseum
 Historisch Museum Turkije-Nederland
 Museum van de twintigste eeuw
 Museumstoomtram Hoorn-Medemblik
 Speelgoedmuseum De Kijkdoos
 Westfries Museum

IJmuiden
 IJmuider Zee- en Havenmuseum
 Bunker Museum IJmuiden

Laren
 Singer Laren

Medemblik
 Nederlands Stoommachinemuseum
 Bakkerijmuseum 'de oude bakkerij'
 Kasteel Radboud

Monnickendam
 DDR-Museum

Naarden
 Nederlands Vestingmuseum

Venhuizen
 Museum Møhlmann

Zaandam
 Zaans Museum
 Zaanse Schans
 Tsaar Peterhuisje
 Verkade Paviljoen

Overijssel

Almelo
 Stadsmuseum Almelo

Ambt Delden
 Museumboerderij Wende Zoele

Blokzijl
 Het Gildenhuys

Delden
 Zoutmuseum

Denekamp
 Natura Docet

Deventer
 Historisch Museum Deventer
 Speelgoed- en Blikmuseum

Enschede
 Rijksmuseum Twenthe
 TwentseWelle

Enter
 Klompen- en Zompenmuseum
 Oudheidkamer Buisjan

Genemuiden
 Tapijtmuseum

Giethoorn
 't Olde Maat Uus
 Museum De Oude Aarde

Haaksbergen
 Museum Buurt Spoorweg

Hardenberg
 HistorieKamer Hardenberg

Heino
 Kasteel Het Nijenhuis, one of two locations of Museum de Fundatie

Hellendoorn
 Gerrit Valk's Bakkerij- en IJsmuseum
 Smederijmuseum

Hengelo
 Historisch Museum Hengelo
 Techniekmuseum Heim

Holten
 Natuurdiorama Holterberg

Kampen
 Ikonenmuseum Kampen
 Stedelijk Museum Kampen

Nieuwleusen
 Museum Palthehof

Oldenzaal
 Museum Palthehuis

Ootmarsum
 Educatorium

Vriezenveen
 Historisch Museum Vriezenveen

Zwolle
 Paleis aan de Blijmarkt, one of two locations of Museum de Fundatie
 Stedelijk Museum Zwolle
 Bonami Games en Computers Museum
 Herman Brood Museum

Utrecht

Amerongen
 Amerongs Historisch- en Tabaksmuseum

Amersfoort
 Armando Museum
 Dutch Cavalry Museum
 Culinair Museum
 De Zonnehof
 The Mondriaan House
 Museum Flehite Amersfoort
 Museum Jacobs van den Hof
 Vindselmuseum in Natura

Bunschoten-Spakenburg
 Klederdracht- en Visserijmuseum
 Museum 't Vurhuus

De Bilt
 Museum Beelden op Beerschoten

Doorn
 Huis Doorn

Driebergen-Rijsenburg
 Museum 't Schilderhuis

Eemnes
 Oudheidkamer Eemnes

IJsselstein
 Stadsmuseum IJsselstein

Maarsbergen
 Kaas-, Museum- & Partyboerderij 'De Weistaar'

Maarssen
 Historisch Museum Maarssen
 Nederlands Drogisterij Museum
 Pygmalion Beeldende Kunst

Nieuwegein
 Historisch Museum Warsenhoek

Oudewater
 Heksenwaag
 Touwmuseum 'De Baanschuur'

Rhenen
 Gemeentemuseum Het Rondeel

Soest
 Museum Oud Soest

Soesterberg
 Nationaal Militair Museum, combination of the former Militaire Luchtvaart Museum and the Legermuseum (Delft)

Utrecht
 Aboriginal Art Museum (closed in 2017)
 Centraal Museum
 nijntje museum
 Geldmuseum (closed in 2013)
 Museum Maluku (closed in 2012)
 Museum Catharijneconvent
 Museum van het Kruideniers-bedrijf or Betje Boerhavemuseum
 Museum Speelklok
 Nederlands Spoorwegmuseum
 Rietveld Schröder House
 Sonnenborgh Observatory
 Universiteitsmuseum (Utrecht)
 Nederlands Volksbuurtmuseum

Veenendaal
 Het Kleine Veenloo
 Vingerhoed Museum

Vianen
 Stedelijk Museum Vianen

Vinkeveen
 Museum de Ronde Venen

Wijk bij Duurstede
 Museum Dorestad

Woerden
 Drive-in Museum
 Stadsmuseum Woerden

Zeeland

Bruinisse
 Visserijmuseum Bruinisse
 Oudheidkamer Bruinisse

Domburg
 Marie Tak van Poortvliet Museum

Goes
 Historisch Museum De Bevelanden

Kapelle
 Fruitteeltmuseum

Meliskerke
 Zijdemuseum

Middelburg
 Zeeuws Museum
 Voetbal Experience

Neeltje Jans
 Deltapark Neeltje Jans

Oostburg
 Oorlogsmuseum Switchback

Oostkapelle
 Terra Maris

Ouwerkerk
 Watersnoodmuseum

Vlissingen
 Het Arsenaal
 Zeeuws Maritiem muZEEum
 Reptielenzoo Iguana

South Holland

Delft
 De Porceleyne Fles
 Legermuseum (closed, 2013 combined with Militaire Luchtvaart Museum, now Nationaal Militair Museum, Soesterberg)
 Museum Paul Tétar van Elven
 Museum Lambert van Meerten
 Museum Nusantara (closed in 2013)
 Prinsenhof
 Vermeer Centre

Dordrecht
 Binnenvaartmuseum
 Dordrechts Museum
 Huis Van Gijn

Gorinchem
 Gorcums Museum

Gouda
 Museum De Moriaan
 MuseumgoudA, onder andere gevestigd in het voormalig Catharina Gasthuis
 Museumhaven Gouda
 Verzetsmuseum Zuid-Holland

Hardinxveld-Giessendam
 De Koperen Knop (cultuurhistorie van de Alblasserwaard)

Hellevoetsluis
 Droogdok Jan Blanken
 Nationaal Brandweermuseum

Katwijk
 Katwijks Museum

Leerdam
 Nationaal Glasmuseum
 Hofje van Mevrouw Van Aerden

Leiden
 Academisch Historisch Museum
 Anatomisch Museum
 Museum Boerhaave (history of science and medicine)
 Hortus Botanicus Leiden
 Stedelijk Museum De Lakenhal (visual art and history)
 Naturalis (natural history)
 Rijksmuseum van Oudheden (antiquities)
 Leiden American Pilgrim Museum
 Pilgrim Archives
 SieboldHuis
 Stedelijk Molenmuseum De Valk
 Museum Volkenkunde (ethnology)
 Museum Het Leids Wevershuis
 Wagenmakersmuseum
 Closed
 Het Koninklijk Penningkabinet (now the Geldmuseum in Utrecht)
 Rijksmuseum van Geologie en Mineralogie (collection is included in Naturalis)
 Rijksmuseum van Natuurlijke Historie (collection is included in Naturalis)

Maassluis
 Nationaal Sleepvaartmuseum

Oegstgeest
 Corpus

Ouddorp
 Streekmuseum Ouddorps Raad- en Polderhuis
 Stichting voorheen RTM, Punt van Goeree

Rotterdam
 Arboretum Trompenburg
 Belasting & Douane Museum
 Chabot Museum
 Havenmuseum in the Leuvehaven nearby the Verolmepaviljoen
 Houweling Telecom Museum
 Kralingsmuseum in Kralingen
 Kunsthal
 Showroom MAMA
 Maritime Museum Rotterdam in the Leuvehaven
 Museum Boijmans Van Beuningen
 Museum Rotterdam, Containing:
 Museum Het Schielandshuis
 Atlas Van Stolk
 Museum De Dubbelde Palmboom
 closed
 Nationaal Onderwijsmuseum
 Natuurhistorisch Museum Rotterdam
 Netherlands Architecture Institute
 Nederlands Fotomuseum
 Rotterdamse Museumtrams (RoMeO)
 Scheepswerf De Delft in Delfshaven
 Wereldmuseum Rotterdam
 Witte de With Center for Contemporary Art

Schiedam
 Jenevermuseum
 Museummolen De Nieuwe Palmboom
 Nationaal Coöperatie Museum Schiedam
 Stedelijk Museum Schiedam

Schoonhoven
 Zilvermuseum

Sommelsdijk
 Streekmuseum Sommelsdijk

Spijkenisse
 Museumwoning 'Back to the Sixties'

The Hague (Den Haag)
 Beelden aan Zee
 Museum Bredius
 Escher Museum
 Fotomuseum Den Haag
 Gemeentemuseum Den Haag
 Gevangenpoort
 Haags Openbaar Vervoer Museum
 Haags Historisch Museum
 Humanity House
 Kinderboekenmuseum
 Letterkundig Museum and Documentationcentre
 Louis Couperus Museum
 Louwman Museum
 Mauritshuis
 Museon
 Museum Bredius
 Museum Meermanno
 Museum Mesdag
 Museum voor Communicatie (Previous PTT museum)
 Muzee Scheveningen
 Panorama Mesdag

Tiengemeten
 Rien Poortvliet Museum

Vlaardingen
 Muziekinformatie- en Documentatiecentrum Ton Stolk
 Streekmuseum Jan Anderson
 Visserij & Vlaardings Museum

Voorschoten
 Duivenvoorde Castle

Wassenaar
 Museum Voorlinden

Caribbean Netherlands

Bonaire 
 Museum Bonaire
 Museo di Belua
 Museum Washington Park
 Museum Kas Krioyo
 Museum Mangasina di Rey
 Museum Fort Oranje

Sint Eustatius 
 Berkel's Family Museum
 Simon Doncker Museum

Saba 
 Harry L. Johnson Museum
 Major Osmar Ralph Simmons Museum

See also
 List of most visited museums in the Netherlands
 Museumkaart

References

External links
 Lijst van musea in Nederland
 museaserver
 Museums in the Netherlands
 Johannesvermeer.info

 
Museums